Brian Cox is an American writer, director and producer of various independent films and television. He is perhaps best known for the films Scorpion Spring, Keepin' It Real and the live-action adaption of El Muerto: The Aztec Zombie, the latter of which won the Best Feature Film Award at the first annual Whittier Film Festival. One of his first credited roles in film was as a script consultant for the 1990 thriller film Behind Bedroom Doors II.

Filmography

Film

Television

References

External links

American film directors
Living people
Year of birth missing (living people)
Place of birth missing (living people)